Ayiloor, also known as Ayilur, Aylur, or Ayalur, is a village in the Chittur Thaluk of Palakkad district, state of Kerala, India. Ayiloor is located about 30 kilometers away from Palakkad town and 48 kilometers from Thrissur town.

Administration 
Ayiloor forms a part of the Ayiloor Grama Panchayat, which is currently ruled by the Left Democratic Front (LDF). The current Panchayth President is Vignesh S, who represents Thiruvazhiyad Ward.

Education 
Government Upper Primary School (GUPS), SM High School (SMHS) and IHRD's College of Applied Science are the major educational institutions located in Ayiloor. GUPS was founded in 1890  and caters to students in pre-primary to 7th grade. Founded in 1948, SM High School has 5th to 10th grade. Established in July 2012, the College of Applied Science offers undergraduate programs in Computer Science, Electronics, and Commerce.

NSS College, Nemmara  is located at a distance of 2.5 Kms from Ayalur.

Healthcare 
Avitis Institute of Medical Sciences, a 200-bed multi-specialty hospital, is located just 4 kilometers away from Ayiloor.

Economy 
Agriculture used to be one of the major sources of income and jobs, however, there has been shift to service oriented economy in the recent decades.

Demographics
 India census, Ayiloor had a population of 8999 with 4394 males and 4605 females.

References

Villages in Palakkad district